Prince's Gardens Preparatory School is a  coeducational private school located in the City of Westminster, England. It is owned by Cognita, an independent schools company.

Headmistress, Alison Melrose, has worked for over 20 years in single and co-ed schools for over 20 years, working at Norland Place School and Broomwood Hall before joining Cognita in 2017.

The school teaches pupils aged 3 to 11 years old in a curriculum based around English National Curriculum, International Early Years Curriculum and ISEB.

References

External links

Private co-educational schools in London
Private schools in the City of Westminster
Preparatory schools in London
Cognita